= Soyol-Erdene Battsengel =

Mongolian gymnast

Soyol-Erdene Battsengel (Mongolian: Соёл-Эрдэнийн Батцэнгэл; born 1993, Mongolia) is a Mongolian gymnast.

In 2022, Battsengel broke the record listed in Guinness World Records by performing the most consecutive gymnastic high bar giants is 1,111 in 33 minutes 30 seconds, beating the previous record of 1001, thereby, he became the Guinness World Records title holder.
